The 1848 Newfoundland general election was held in 1848 to elect members of the 4th General Assembly of Newfoundland in Newfoundland Colony. The use of two separate bodies, an elected assembly and an appointed Legislative Council, was resumed; the experiment with combining the two bodies which had been initiated in 1842 was terminated. While the exact party composition of the Newfoundland House of Assembly following this election is unknown; the Liberals did enjoy a majority.

 St. John's District
 John Kent Liberal (speaker)
 Laurence O'Brien Liberal
 Robert John Parsons Liberal
 Conception Bay District
 James Luke Prendergast Liberal
 Edmund Hanrahan Liberal
 Nicholas Molloy
 Richard Rankin
 Ferryland District
 Peter Winser
 Placentia and St. Mary's District
 Ambrose Shea Liberal
 John Delaney Liberal
 Burin District
 Joshua George Falle
 Fortune Bay District
 Hugh William Hoyles Conservative
 Trinity Bay District
 Thomas Bulley Job Conservative
 Bonavista Bay District
 Robert Carter Conservative
 Fogo District
 George Henry Emerson

References 
 

1848
1848 elections in North America
1848 elections in Canada
Pre-Confederation Newfoundland
1848 in Newfoundland